Bozkanat is a village in the Solhan District, Bingöl Province, Turkey. The village is populated by Kurds and had a population of 342 in 2021.

The hamlets of Ortaca, Topluca and Uyanık attached to the village.

References 

Villages in Solhan District
Kurdish settlements in Bingöl Province